Flight 710 may refer to:

Northwest Orient Airlines Flight 710, crashed on 17 March 1960
Pacific Southwest Airlines Flight 710, hijacked on 5 July 1972
Air Illinois Flight 710, crashed on 11 October 1983
Widerøe Flight 710, crashed on 6 May 1988

0710